American musician Bruce Springsteen has released 21 studio albums, 23 live albums, 77 singles, and 66 music videos. Widely referred as "The Boss" by the media, Springsteen has sold over 150 million records worldwide, listing him among the best-selling music artists in history. Billboard ranked him as the 24th Greatest Artist of all time. According to Recording Industry Association of America, he has sold 65.5 million albums in the United States, making him the 7th best-selling male soloist of all time. Born in the U.S.A. remains the best-selling album of his career, selling more than 30 million copies around the world.

Springsteen has released records steadily since 1973, and is widely known for his brand of heartland rock infused with pop hooks, poetic lyrics, and American culture sentiments centered on his native New Jersey. The E Street Band have been Springsteen's primary backing band since 1972 and have appeared on a majority of his studio albums and live releases. Springsteen also released one studio and live album with the Sessions Band.

Springsteen's recordings have tended to alternate between commercially accessible rock albums and somber folk-oriented works.  His most commercially successful period occurred between 1975's Born to Run and 1987's Tunnel of Love. 1984's Born in the U.S.A. launched Springsteen into superstardom and the album went on to become one of the biggest selling albums of all time. It produced seven top-10 hit singles, tied for the most ever with Michael Jackson's Thriller and Janet Jackson's Rhythm Nation 1814. Springsteen has steadily maintained a loyal audience since his 80s success and experienced a renewed commercial strength since 2002's The Rising, the first in a string of consecutive successful albums following a 1999 reunion with the E Street Band with whom he parted ways in 1989. 2014's High Hopes was Springsteen's eleventh No. 1 album placing him at third all-time for most No. 1 albums ever trailing only Jay-Z (13) and the Beatles (19). He achieved his eleventh No. 1 album in the UK with his next release, 2019's Western Stars, which saw him join Elvis Presley and Robbie Williams on eleven UK No. 1s, trailing only Madonna (12) and the Beatles (15). In October 2019, Springsteen released a theatrical film for Western Stars which marked his directorial debut. The film was accompanied by the Western Stars – Songs from the Film soundtrack. Springsteen's twenty-first and latest album, Only the Strong Survive, was released in 2022. 

Overall, Springsteen has released 20 studio albums, 77 singles, 8 extended plays, 23 live albums, 7 box sets, 8 compilation albums, 1 soundtrack, 66 music videos and 17 home videos. In 2014, Springsteen opened the Bruce Springsteen Archives and announced that he will release various shows from his past that have been digitally restored and remastered and, unlike the bootleg releases, officially endorsed by Springsteen himself.

Albums

Studio albums

Live albums

Live archive releases

Soundtrack albums

Compilation albums

Box sets

Extended plays

Singles

Promotional singles / Other charted songs

Various artists releases
Springsteen has also contributed a number of performances to various artists' collections that have not been included on his own albums.

Studio

Live

Guest appearances

Singles

Albums

Videography

Video albums

Music videos

Notes

References

External links
Rolling Stone's Bruce Springsteen album guide
 German Wikipedia discography including German, Austrian, and Swiss releases

Discography
Rock music discographies
Discographies of American artists